This Man is News is a 1938 British comedy mystery film directed by David MacDonald and starring Barry K. Barnes, Valerie Hobson, Alastair Sim and Edward Lexy. The screenplay concerns a journalist who solves a crime of which he himself is suspected
. A "quota quickie", it was made for a mere £6,000, but "was among the highest grossing films of 1938".

It was loosely modelled on the American Thin Man series of films. A sequel, This Man in Paris, was made in 1939.

Plot
Simon Drake (Barnes) has predicted the death of a prominent man in advance, which makes him Scotland yard's top suspect for his murder; the only one who believes in his innocence is his loyal wife Pat (Hobson). Meanwhile, Macgregor (Sim) is Drake's beleaguered city editor, who hires and fires him multiple times depending on how guilty or innocent he looks at the moment.

Cast
 Barry K. Barnes as Simon Drake
 Valerie Hobson as Pat Drake
 Alastair Sim as Lochlan Macgregor
 Edward Lexy as Inspector Hollis
 Garry Marsh as Sergeant Bright
 John Warwick as Johnnie Clayton
 Philip Leaver as "Harelip" Murphy
 James Birrie as Doyle
 David Keir as Brown

Critical reception
TV Guide gave the film three out of five stars and wrote, "Though Barnes and Hobson may not quite be another William Powell and Myrna Loy, they handle the assignment with humor and great style. The film is directed with energy and the dialogue helps carry the brisk pace along. This is the first screenwriting credit for Basil Dearden, who would go on to do many stories, both serious and topical, in association with noted British producer and art director Michael Relph."

References

External links

1938 films
British comedy mystery films
1930s comedy mystery films
Films shot at Pinewood Studios
Quota quickies
Films produced by Anthony Havelock-Allan
Paramount Pictures
Films with screenplays by Basil Dearden
British black-and-white films
1938 comedy films
1930s English-language films
1930s British films